Vladimír Chovan (born September 26, 1963) is a Slovak politician (People's Party – Movement for a Democratic Slovakia) and used to be Minister of Agriculture of the Slovak Republic. 
	
Chovan studied at the Slovak University of Agriculture, Faculty of Mechanization of Agriculture, Nitra, and finished in 1985.  He is married and has two children.

He replaced Stanislav Becík as a result of to inner-party rivalries and was announced Minister of Agriculture by president Ivan Gašparovič September 23, 2009. He pledges for a change in the Common Agricultural Policy in the European Union. Chovan refused denials that his ministry is involved in corruption.

Footnotes

External links
Official government website depicting Chovan 
Ministry of Agriculture of the Slovak Republic 
Ministry of Agriculture of the Slovak Republic 

1963 births
Living people
People's Party – Movement for a Democratic Slovakia politicians